The Kele or Sheke languages are a clade of Bantu languages coded Zone B.20 in Guthrie's classification. According to Nurse & Philippson (2003), apart possibly from Seki (Sheke) (B.21) itself, the languages form a valid node. They are:
Lengue, Ndasa, Sigu (Sighu), Kele (Dikele), Ngom, Mbangwe, Wumbvu, Kota, Shake (Sake), Mahongwe, ?Seki (Sheke)

Maho (2009) adds B203 Sama, B204 Ndambomo, B205 Metombola.

Footnotes

References